José Pinheiro may refer to:

 José Pinheiro (fencer) (born 1938), Portuguese Olympic fencer
 José Pinheiro (director) (born 1945), French film director
 José Pinheiro (rowing) (born 1933), Portuguese Olympic rower
 José Alberto Pinheiro (born 1980), Portuguese director, screenwriter and producer

See also
 Francisco José Pinheiro (born 1954), Brazilian historian, writer, and politician